Mộc Bài is an international border gate between Vietnam and Cambodia located in Tây Ninh Province, Vietnam. Its counterpart across the border is the Bavet border gate, Svay Rieng Province, Cambodia. As it is located on the main highway between Ho Chi Minh City and Phnom Penh, the border crossing is one of the busiest land entry points into Vietnam.

Transportation
The border crossing is part of the Trans-Asia Highway connecting Phnom Penh and Ho Chi Minh City. In Vietnam, the border crossing is on Vietnam's National Highway 22 which goes through Củ Chi to Ho Chi Minh City 70 km away.

Vietnamese E-visas
Besides the conventional visas for entering Vietnam, the checkpoint is also an entry point for Vietnamese E-visas.

Economic zone
The Mộc Bài economic zone (BQL Khu kinh tế cửa khẩu Mộc Bài) is 21,284 hectares in area, and is included in Bến Cầu and Trảng Bàng districts, Tây Ninh Province. This area is 70 km from Ho Chi Minh City and 170 km from Phnom Penh.

Gallery

See also
AH1

References

Website Moc Bai Economic ZoneKhu
Website Tay Ninh Committee

Buildings and structures in Tây Ninh province
Cambodia–Vietnam border crossings